The name Mekkhala has been used for four tropical cyclones in the western north Pacific Ocean. The name was contributed by Thailand and refers to Mekhala, a guardian-angel of the seas in South Asian myths. This name was spelt Megkhla by the WMO prior to an orthographic update made in 2002.

 Tropical Storm Mekkhala (2002) (T0220, 24W)
 Tropical Storm Mekkhala (2008) (T0816, 20W) – affected southern China.
 Severe Tropical Storm Mekkhala (2015) (T1501, 01W, Amang) – the first tropical storm of the 2015 season.
 Severe Tropical Storm Mekkhala (2020) (T2006, 07W, Ferdie) – impacted southern China as a severe tropical storm.

Pacific typhoon set index articles